Radical 35 or radical go slowly is one of the 31 Kangxi radicals (214 radicals total) composed of three strokes.

In the Kangxi Dictionary, there are 23 characters (out of 49,030) to be found under this radical.

No associated indexing component was left after the merger.

Evolution

Derived characters

Literature

External links

Unihan Database – U+590A

035